Harry Voigt (15 June 1913 – 29 October 1986) was a German athlete who competed mainly in the 400 metres.

Voigt was born in Berlin. He competed for Germany in the 1936 Summer Olympics held in Berlin, Germany in the 4 x 400 metre relay where he won the bronze medal with his team mates Helmut Hamann, Friedrich von Stülpnagel and Rudolf Harbig. He died in Barver, Diepholz, Lower Saxony.

References 

1913 births
1986 deaths
Athletes (track and field) at the 1936 Summer Olympics
German male sprinters
Olympic athletes of Germany
Olympic bronze medalists for Germany
Athletes from Berlin
European Athletics Championships medalists
Medalists at the 1936 Summer Olympics
Olympic bronze medalists in athletics (track and field)